Bang Phai station is a Bangkok MRT rapid transit station on the Blue Line, located above Phet Kasem Road located in Bangkok, Thailand, in the area known as "Bang Phai" (the beginning of Khlong Phasi Charoen). Not to be confused with the Khlong Bang Phai station on the Purple Line.

Viaduct

This station is unique in that it differs from other stations in that it has a viaduct crosses over the tracks to the other side.  It was built for the purpose of inviting the relics of the Buddha along the canal in the annual Chak Phra festival of nearby Wat Nang Chi. According to tradition, the relic cannot pass under any bridge or road.

Neighbourhoods
Wat Paknam Bhasicharoen
Wat Nang Chi Chotikaram
Wat Nuannoradit
Khlong Bang Luang Artist House and Khlong Bang Luang Floating Market
Wat Kamphaeng Bangchak
Wat Absorn Sawan
Bangphai General Hospital
Phyathai 3 Hospital

References 

MRT (Bangkok) stations
2019 establishments in Thailand
Railway stations opened in 2019